Sergei Valeryevich Kolychev (born 28 September 1988) is a Russian professional football defender.

Career

Club
He played 3 seasons in the Russian Football National League for FC Luch-Energiya Vladivostok and FC Rotor Volgograd.

On 1 June 2019, Kolychev was released by FC Pyunik.

References

External links
 
 
 

1988 births
Footballers from Moscow
Living people
Russian footballers
Association football defenders
FC Luch Vladivostok players
FC Sakhalin Yuzhno-Sakhalinsk players
FC Rotor Volgograd players
FC Pyunik players
Russian Second League players
Russian First League players
Armenian Premier League players
Russian expatriate footballers
Expatriate footballers in Armenia
Russian expatriate sportspeople in Armenia